David Edwin Ambrose (born 21 February 1943) is a British novelist, playwright and screenwriter. His credits include at least twenty films, four stage plays, and many hours of television, including the controversial Alternative 3 (1977). He was born in Chorley, Lancashire, and educated at Blackburn Grammar School and Merton College, Oxford. He was married to the Swiss-born artist Laurence Ambrose from 1979 until her death in 2019.

Early life 

After passing the eleven-plus, Ambrose attended Queen Elizabeth's Grammar School, Blackburn, between 1954 and 1961. From 1962 until 1965 he studied law at Merton College, Oxford. While there he wrote two plays which were successfully performed (one winning an OUDS prize for best college production) as well as directing and acting in several productions. He was also a frequent debater in the Oxford Union Society, where he served a term on standing committee.

Despite winning a mock trial in front of a high court judge while still an undergraduate, resulting in an offer of excellent chambers to begin a career at the bar, he chose to try his luck in show business.

Early career 

For three years he supported himself by freelance journalism, mainly for The Observer, where he wrote book reviews and conducted “Arts” interviews with subjects including Peggy Ashcroft, Robert Bolt, Neil Simon, Harold Pinter and Alec Guinness. He was also, briefly, artistic director of the new Adeline Genee Theatre in Surrey.

Throughout this period he had been writing plays and film scripts, one of which was bought by Dirk Bogarde (though never produced), and two of which were successfully produced by a major television company (ATV).

In early 1968, a few weeks after his twenty-fifth birthday, he was hired to re-write the entire script of a sprawling Roman epic which was about to start shooting in Romania under the direction of Hollywood veteran Robert Siodmak, and with a cast headed by Laurence Harvey, Orson Welles, Sylva Koscina and Honor Blackman.

This led to a genuine and lasting friendship with Welles, who took the young writer under his wing and imparted many invaluable tips about his craft. As Ambrose writes in his memoir, “A Fate Worse Than Hollywood” (Zuleika Publishing, 2019), “I was… getting a one-on-one course on screenwriting from Orson Welles. Not a privilege enjoyed by many, I suspect. Of course, being young, I took it all for granted at the time; and, indeed, Orson made it seem like the most natural thing in the world”.

In 1972 his first stage play, “Siege”, was produced in London’s West End, starring Alastair Sim, Stanley Holloway and Michael Bryant.

In 1974 he scripted the international feature film “The Fifth Musketeer”, directed by Ken Annakin, with a cast including Rex Harrison, Ursula Andress and Olivia de Havilland).
Aside from these two ventures he wrote, between 1969 and 1977, around a hundred hours of UK television. In addition to many single plays, he contributed to popular series such as “Colditz”, “Justice”, “Hadleigh”, “Public Eye”, “Oil Strike North”, and “Orson Welles Great Mysteries”.
In 1977 he wrote the fake documentary “Alternative 3”, an only slightly tongue-in-cheek story about an international effort to escape a doomed Planet Earth and establish a survivors’ colony on Mars. The show became a worldwide sensation. Several books have been written about it, and it is still referenced widely in literature and film. “The Guinness Book of Television Facts and Feats” (1984) described it as “The biggest hoax in television drama. In a way reminiscent of the scare caused by Orson Welles’s radio spoof, War of the Worlds in 1938.” Many viewers took it to be the literal truth and telephoned TV stations, newspapers and even government offices in alarm.

Hollywood career 

After “Alternative 3” Ambrose was approached by a leading Hollywood agent and paid his first visit there in August 1977. Within days he was sitting with Gene Roddenberry, the legendary creator of “Star Trek”, working on future story concepts and doing uncredited (minor) re-writes on the first feature film. 
Coincidentally, William Shatner, “Star Trek’s” Captain Kirk, would play the lead in his next project, a feature-length TV movie called “Disaster on the Coastliner”. The supporting cast included Yvette Mimieux and several icons of his TV-watching childhood, including Raymond Burr, Lloyd Bridges and E. G. Marshall.

He went on to work with a number of “Hollywood’s Gold Age” stars in their later careers, including Richard Widmark, David Niven, Joseph Cotten, James Mason, and in particular Kirk Douglas, for whom he scripted “The Final Countdown” (1980) the now classic sci-fi movie. He went on to work with newer stars including Pierce Brosnan (“Taffin”, 1988), and Sharon Stone (“Year of the Gun”, 1991, directed by John Frankenheimer).

Europe and worldwide 

In 1980 his script for “The Survivor”, shot in Australia with Robert Powell, Jenny Agutter and Joseph Cotten, directed by David Hemmings, won the best script award at the Sitges International Film Festival.

Also in Australia, in 1982, his script “A Dangerous Summer” (co-written with Kit Denton, Quentin Masters and Jim McElroy) was shot starring James Mason and Tom Skerritt.

In 1987 he directed his own script for “Comeback”, produced in the UK by Yorkshire Television, starring Anton Rodgers and Stephen Dillane. The film was nominated for the Prix Italia.

In 1989 he was invited to France to script a six-hour, two-part film telling the story of “The French Revolution”. Directed by Robert Enrico and Richard Heffron, with an international cast including Peter Ustinov, Klaus-Maria Brandauer, Sam Neill, Claudia Cardinale, Christopher Lee and Jane Seymour, it was one of the biggest projects ever mounted in Europe.

Later career 

In 1993 Ambrose published his first novel, “The Man Who Turned Into Himself”. This was followed by five others, described as "Hitchcock meets Hawking", over the next ten years, along with a collection of short stories “Hollywood Lies”. 

In 1990 his play “Abra-Cadaver” (co-written with Allan Scott) was produced at the Theatre Royal, Windsor, starring Frank Langella.

In 1991 his play “Restoration Comedy” (co-written with Michael Gearin-Tosh) was produced in Oxford.

In 2016 his play “Act 3…” (co-written with Claudia Nellens) was produced at the Laguna Beach Theatre in California starring Rita Rudner and Charles Shaughnessy.

In November 2019 Zuleika Publishing published his memoir “A Fate Worse Than Hollywood”.

Bibliography

Novels
 The Man Who Turned Into Himself, Jonathan Cape, 1993 (UK); reissued by MacMillan (Picador) in 2008
 Mother of God, Macmillan, 1995 (UK); Simon & Schuster, 1996 (US)
 Superstition, Macmillan, 1997 (UK); Warner Books, 1998 (US)
 The Discrete Charm of Charlie Monk, Macmillan, 2000 (UK)
 Coincidence,  Macmillan, 2001 (UK); Warner Books, 2002 (US)
 A Memory of Demons, Macmillan, 2003 (UK); Pocket Books, 2004 (US)

Short stories
 Hollywood Lies, Macmillan, 1996 (UK); Pan, 1998; Reprinted Pocket Books, 2008 (US)

Filmography

Films
 Year of the Gun (1991) – screenplay
 La Révolution française (1989) – screenplay
 Taffin (1988) – screenplay
 D.A.R.Y.L. (1985) – screenplay
 Blackout (1985) – screenplay
 Amityville 3-D (1983) – screenplay (as William Wales)
 The Final Countdown (1980) – story, screenplay
 The Survivor (1980) – screenplay
 A Dangerous Summer (1980) – screenplay
 A Man Called Intrepid (1979) – screenplay
 The Fifth Musketeer (1974) – screenplay

TV specials
 Alternative 3 (1977) – original screenplay

TV feature-length films
 Remembrance (1996) – screenplay
 Fall From Grace (1994) – screenplay
 Comeback (1987) – screenplay/director
 Disaster on the Coastliner (1979) – screenplay

TV series
 Justice – chief writer, two series
 Hadleigh – chief writer, two series
 Colditz – episodes
 Public Eye – episodes
 Oil Strike North – episodes
 Orson Welles Great Mysteries – episodes

TV drama (UK)
 Nanny's Boy (1976) – writer
 A Variety of Passion  (1975) – writer
 Goose with Pepper (1975) – writer
 Love Me to Death (1974) – writer
 Reckoning Day (1973) – writer
 When the Music Stops (1972) – writer
 The Professional (1972) – writer
 The Undoing (1970) – writer
 The Innocent Ceremony (1970) – writer
 Public Face (1969) – writer

Stage plays
 Siege (1972) Cambridge Theatre, London, with Alastair Sim, Stanley Holloway and Michael Bryant
 Abra-Cadaver (1990), UK, with Frank Langella
 Restoration Comedy (1991), Oxford
 Act 3 (2016), Laguna Beach Theatre, California, with Rita Rudner and Charles Shaughnessy.

References

External links
 
  David Ambrose's Books on Simon & Schuster
  David Ambrose page on Fantastic Fiction
  Mostly Fiction book review: Charlie Monk
  Book review, Mother of God
 Radio 4 Screenshot Episode April 21st 2022

1943 births
Living people
People from Chorley
20th-century English novelists
21st-century English novelists
Alumni of Merton College, Oxford
English male novelists
English screenwriters
English male screenwriters
English television writers
20th-century English male writers
21st-century English male writers
British male television writers